Digunai (24 February 1122 – 15 December 1161), also known by his sinicised name Wanyan Liang (完顏亮) and his formal title Prince of Hailing (海陵王, Hǎilíng Wáng), was the fourth emperor of the Jurchen-led Jin dynasty of China. He was the second son of Wanyan Zonggan, the eldest son of Aguda (Emperor Taizu) (the founder of the Jin dynasty). He came to power in 1150 after overthrowing and murdering his predecessor, Emperor Xizong, in a coup d'état. During his reign, he moved the Jin capital from Shangjing (present-day Acheng District, Harbin, Heilongjiang Province) to Yanjing (present-day Beijing), and introduced a policy of sinicisation. In 1161, after the Jin dynasty lost the Battle of Caishi against the Southern Song dynasty, Digunai's subordinates rebelled against him and assassinated him. After his death, even though he ruled as an emperor during his lifetime, he was posthumously demoted to the status of a prince – "Prince Yang of Hailing" (海陵煬王) – in 1162 by his successor, Emperor Shizong. However, in 1181, Emperor Shizong further posthumously demoted him to the status of a commoner, hence he is also known as the "Commoner of Hailing" (海陵庶人).

Background

Digunai was the second son of Woben (斡本; also known as Wanyan Zonggan 完顏宗幹), a son of Aguda (Emperor Taizu), the founder of the Jin dynasty. His mother was, Lady Da, came from an elite family of Balhae descent. Emperor Taizu's brother and successor, Emperor Taizong, started a series of wars between the Jin and Song dynasties. During the reign of Emperor Xizong, who succeeded Emperor Taizong, Wanyan Zonggan was described as the most influential man in the Jin imperial court.

Digunai, who was an army marshal under Emperor Xizong, overthrew the emperor in a coup d'état in 1150 and replaced him. Having seized the throne through illegitimate means, Digunai was suspicious of other members of the Jurchen aristocracy, and, immediately upon taking the throne, started eliminating potential rivals. He ordered the massacre of the descendants of Emperor Taizong, so as to secure the position of the lineage of Emperor Taizu, to which he belonged.

Reign 
Digunai capitalised on the Jin dynasty's "superior status" vis-à-vis the Song dynasty after its victory over the latter in 1141, and sought to make the Jin dynasty the sole Chinese empire. To legitimise himself as a sinicised ruler, in 1150 he lifted Emperor Taizong's prohibition of wearing Han Chinese dress, and adopted an array of Han Chinese practices and institutions, such as holding of sacrificial ceremonies in the northern and southern suburbs of his capital in 1149 (cf. ceremonies conducted at the Temple of Earth and Temple of Heaven in Beijing during the Ming and Qing dynasties), the use of the imperial carriage in 1151, a system of feudal rights in 1156, and the Song dynasty's shan-hu (山呼) style of court ceremonies in 1157. Digunai also introduced the imperial examination system in 1150 and set up the Imperial Academy in the following year. In his pursuit for greater sinicisation and the desire to acquire the Mandate of Heaven, Digunai moved his imperial court from Shangjing (present-day Acheng District, Harbin, Heilongjiang Province to Yanjing (present-day Beijing) in 1153. In 1157, he ordered the destruction of the imperial palaces in Shangjing.

In contrast to the traditions of the Tang and Song dynasties, which rarely imposed corporal punishment on the members of the society's educated elites, Digunai continued the Khitan and Jurchen tradition of floggings with gusto, sometimes enjoying personally watching his subjects – including chancellors, censors, and a princess – beaten with poles or whips.

Assassination 

Digunai's attempts to conquer the Southern Song dynasty and unify China under the Jin dynasty's rule ended in failure when his fleet was defeated by Song forces at the battles of Tangdao and Caishi in 1161. Many of his officers defected and in some places the people rebelled against him. His subordinates conspired against him and assassinated him on 15 December 1161 in a military camp near the Yangtze River. Digunai's cousin, Wulu, who had led a rebellion against Digunai's rule, was proclaimed the new emperor.

Family

Parents
 Father: Woben (斡本), sinicised name Wanyan Zonggan (完顏宗幹)
 Mother:  Empress Cixian, of the Da clan of Bohai (慈憲皇后大氏)
Consort and issue(s):
 Empress Tudan (徒單皇后; d.1170),  of the Tudan clan
Wanyan Guangying, Crown Prince (太子 完顏光英, 1150 – 1161), 2nd son
 Noble Consort, of the Tangkuo clan  (貴妃 唐括氏), personal name Dingge (定哥)
 Nailahu (奈剌忽), First Consort (元妃), ex-wife of Zhang Ding'an (張定安)
First Consort, of the Da clan of Bohai (元妃 大氏), 
Wanyan Yuanshou, Prince of Chong (崇王 完顏元壽, d. 1151), 1st son
Consort Li, of the Tangukuo clan (麗妃唐括氏), personal name Shigge (石哥)
 Wanyan Shensi'abu, Prince of Su (宿王 完顏矧思阿補, 1156 – 1158), 3rd son
Consort Chen, of the Xiao clan (宸妃 蕭氏)
Consort Li, of the Yelü clan  (麗妃 耶律氏)
 Consort Zhao, of the Pucha clan (昭妃 蒲察氏), personal name Alihu (阿里虎)
Consort Zhao (昭妃), personal name Alan (阿懶)
Consort Rou, of the Yelü clan (柔妃 耶律氏)
Consort Zhao, of th Wanyan clan  (昭妃完顏氏), personal name Shigu (什古)
Consort Shu, of the Wanyan clan (淑妃完顏氏), personal name Pula (蒲剌)
Consort Shu, of the Wanyan clan (淑妃完顏氏), personal name Shigu'er (師姑兒)
Consort Gui, of the Wanyan clan (貴妃 完顏氏), personal name Shaliguzhen (莎里古真) 
Consort Zhao, of the Wanyan clan  (昭妃), personal name Chongjie (重節)
Consort Li, of Tanguko clan (麗妃唐括氏),, personal name Puluhuzhi (魯胡只)
Zhaoyuan, of the Yelü clan (昭媛 耶律氏)
Xiuyi, of the Gao clan (修儀 高氏)
Cairen, of the Nan clan  (才人 南氏)
Wanyan Guangyang, Prince of Teng (滕王 完顏廣陽), 4th son
Lady, of the Pucha clan (蒲察氏), personal name Chacha (叉察)
 Unknown:
 Princess of Rong (榮國公主), personal name Henü (合女) 
married Tushan Sila (單術斯剌)
 Unnamed Princess
 married Xiao Yu's son (蕭玉) 
 Unnamed Princess
 married Wugulun Yi (烏古論誼)

See also 
 History of Beijing

References

Citations

Sources 
 Jing-shen Tao, The Jurchen in Twelfth-Century China. University of Washington Press, 1976, .

1122 births
1161 deaths
Jin dynasty (1115–1234) emperors
12th-century Chinese monarchs
Murdered Chinese emperors